Jōkan-ji is a Buddhist temple in Tokyo, Japan. Its cemetery houses the remains and spirits of about 25,000 prostitutes and fire victims of the Yoshiwara quarter of the Edo period. A memorial to the dead was consecrated in the Meiji era.

The temple was opened on 1655. The dead bodies of prostitutes of the Yoshiwara quarter who were too poor, which was the vast majority of them, were tucked into a hay mat and brought to the back entrance of the temple and left there. This is frequently and incorrectly claimed as the reason that the temple became popularly known as Nage-komi-dera (Throw-away temple). However, the actual reason for the name is due to the mass burial of about 500 prostitutes after Great Ansei earthquake in 1855 which was done in haste to prevent disease. Additionally, the use of hay mat and abandonment were limited to those who committed crimes and/or broke rules of brothels prior to death.

See also 
 Ubasute

References

External links 
 Homepage of Jōkan-ji
 A ride on the darker side of Tokyo's history at The Japan Times

Buddhist temples in Tokyo